Flaminio Costa v ENEL (1964) Case 6/64 was a landmark decision of the European Court of Justice which established the primacy of European Union law (then Community law) over the laws of its member states.

Facts
Mr. Costa was an Italian citizen who had owned shares in an electricity company, Edisonvolta, and opposed the nationalisation of the electricity sector in Italy. He asked two lower courts in Milan (two different Giudici conciliatori) to ascertain that the real creditor of his electricity bill (a relatively small amount of money, 1,925 lire) was the nationalised company, Edisonvolta, and not the newly established state company, Enel. He argued that the nationalisation of the electricity industry violated the Treaty of Rome and the Italian Constitution. The first Giudice conciliatore of Milan referred the case to the Italian Constitutional Court and the second Giudice conciliatore referred it to the European Court of Justice.

The Italian Constitution Court gave judgement in March 1964, ruling that while the Italian Constitution allowed for the limitation of sovereignty under an international organisation like the European Economic Community, it did not upset that normal rule of statutory interpretation that, where two statutes conflict, the subsequent one prevails (lex posterior derogat legi anteriori/priori). As a result, the Treaty of Rome which was incorporated into Italian law in 1958 could not prevail over the electricity nationalisation law which was enacted in 1962.

In light of the decision of the constitutional court, the Italian government submitted to the ECJ that the Italian court's request for a preliminary ruling from the ECJ was inadmissible on the grounds that, as the Italian court was not empowered to set aside the national law in question, a preliminary ruling would not serve any valid purpose.

Judgment
The ECJ held that the Treaty of Rome rule on an undistorted market was one on which the Commission alone could challenge the Italian government. As an individual, Costa had no standing to challenge the decision, because that Treaty provision had no direct effect. However, Costa could raise a point of EC law against a national government, in legal proceeding before the courts in that member state, since EC law would not be effective, if Costa could not challenge national law on the basis of its alleged incompatibility with EC law.

Significance
This groundbreaking case established the principle of supremacy in EU law, which is an independent source of law that cannot be overridden by domestic laws.

Article I-6 of the proposed European Constitution stated: "The Constitution and law adopted by the institutions of the Union in exercising competences conferred on it shall have primacy over the law of the Member States". The constitution was never ratified, after being rejected in referendums in France and the Netherlands in 2005. Its replacement, the Treaty of Lisbon, did not include the article on primacy but instead included a declaration recalling the case-law.

French Judge Robert Lecourt, who was on the Court from 1962 to 1976, would later argue these decisions "added nothing" other than to "give effect" to the treaties, an effect he felt was "commanded" by their being.

See also
Direct effect
Factortame
Thoburn v Sunderland City Council
Van Gend en Loos v Nederlandse Administratie der Belastingen

Notes

External links
Judgment of the Court of 15 July 1964. Flaminio Costa v E.N.E.L. Reference for a preliminary ruling: Giudice conciliatore di Milano – Italy. Case 6–64
Judgment of the Court (Sixth Chamber) of 12 December 2002. French Republic v Commission of the European Communities. Action for annulment – State aid – Common organisation of the markets – Wine – Measures for adapting vineyards in Charentes. Case C-456/00

1964 in Italy
European Union constitutional law
Court of Justice of the European Union case law
1964 in case law
Energy in Italy
Italian case law